is a Japanese football player who plays for Kamatamare Sanuki.

Club career
After graduating Ginowan High School in 1999, he joined J2 League side Kawasaki Frontale. He made his professional debut on May 2, 1999 against Vegalta Sendai. His first professional goal came on May 13, 2000 against Nagoya Grampus Eight. Frontale won the champions in 1999 season and was promoted to J1 League. However the club was finished at bottom place in J1 in 2000 season and was returned to J2 in a year. In 2003, he became a regular forward. In 2004, he scored 22 goals and he was the 2nd top J2 League scorer. He helped lead Frontale to the J2 League championship and Frontale was promoted to J1. In 2006, he scored 18 goals and he was the 3rd top J1 League scorer. Frontale also finished at the 2nd place in 2006 season. However his opportunity to play decreased from 2007 season.

During the 2007 season, Ganaha was suspended for six games due to alleged infringement of the anti-doping code by intravenous therapy with saline solution and vitamin B1, due to dehydration and inability to take fluids orally. Ganaha appealed the case to the Court of Arbitration for Sport (CAS) in December 2007, and on May 26, 2008, CAS issued a ruling supporting him and to have the six game suspension reversed.

Ganaha transferred the register to Vissel Kobe in 2009. Although he played in 2 seasons, he could not play many matches and he could only scored a goal in 2009 J.League Cup.

In 2011, Ganaha moved to Japan Football League club FC Ryukyu based in his local Okinawa Prefecture. He played as regular forward and scored many goals. The club was also promoted to new league J3 League from 2014.

In January 2014, Ganaha moved to newly was promoted to J2 club Kamatamare Sanuki, without playing for FC Ryukyu in J3. Although the club results was sluggish, he played many matches until 2016. However his opportunity to play decreased and the club finished at the bottom place in 2018 season and was relegated to J3.

National team career
Ganaha made his senior national team debut on August 9, 2006, in a friendly against Trinidad and Tobago, the first match under the reign of new national coach Ivica Osim. He is the first Okinawa-born footballer to play for the Japanese National Team. His first international goal was an injury time winner in an 2007 Asian Cup qualifier against Yemen, held on September 6, 2006 in San‘a’, Yemen. He also scored 2 goals in another qualifier against Saudi Arabia. He played 6 games and scored 3 goals for Japan in 2006.

Club statistics

National team statistics

National team career statistics

Appearances in major competitions

Goals for senior national team

References

External links

Japan National Football Team Database

1980 births
Living people
Association football people from Okinawa Prefecture
Japanese footballers
Japan international footballers
J1 League players
J2 League players
J3 League players
Japan Football League players
Kawasaki Frontale players
Vissel Kobe players
FC Ryukyu players
Kamatamare Sanuki players
Association football forwards